Columbia Data Center is Microsoft's data center in Quincy, Washington. Property at Quincy was purchased in 2006; the building opened in April, 2007; and the data center reached operational status in May, 2007. It was said to be the largest data center in the world as of 2015. The company located there due to low land costs, abundant data fiber, and extremely low cost electricity provided by Grant County PUD for as little as 1.9 or 2.5 cents per kilowatt-hour.
The data center consumed 30 to 50 megawatts in 2012 and employs 50 people.

References

Buildings and structures in Grant County, Washington
Data centers